Route 72 is a state highway in the U.S. state of New Jersey. It runs  from the Four Mile Circle with Route 70 in Woodland Township in Burlington County to County Route 607 (CR 607) in Ship Bottom on Long Beach Island in Ocean County. Route 72 travels through the Pine Barrens as a two-lane undivided road. After an interchange with the Garden State Parkway, the route becomes a four- to six-lane divided highway through built-up areas of Manhawkin and crosses the Manahawkin Bay via the Manahawkin Bay Bridge onto Long Beach Island.

What is now Route 72 was originally designated as Route S40 in 1927, a spur of Route 40 (now Route 70) running from Four Mile to Manahawkin. The road was extended to Ship Bottom by 1941 before it was renumbered to Route 72 in 1953. A realignment that took place in 1969 between U.S. Route 9 (US 9) and the Manahawkin Bay Bridge resulted in the designation of Route 180 on the former alignment; this road is now CR 50. Plans in the late 1960s and the 1970s called for a proposed Route 72 freeway, running from the western terminus at Route 70 to the concurrently proposed Interstate 895 (I-895) at the New Jersey Turnpike in Westampton Township, connecting Philadelphia's northern suburbs with the Jersey Shore.  The freeway plans along with I-895 were canceled by the 1980s. The Manahawkin Bay Bridge underwent deck repairs completed in May 2010, with the bridge slated to be rehabilitated and a parallel span to be built to the south.

Route description

Route 72 begins at the Four Mile Circle intersection with Route 70, CR 644, and CR 646 in Woodland Township, Burlington County, heading to the southeast on Barnegat Road, a two-lane undivided road. The route passes through heavily wooded areas of the Pine Barrens that are a part of the Brendan T. Byrne State Forest. The road passes near a state hospital before coming to an intersection with the northern terminus of CR 563. Past CR 563, the route continues through the Pine Barrens, passing under an abandoned railroad line prior to a junction with CR 532. Here, Route 72 forms a concurrency with CR 532 and the road enters Barnegat Township in Ocean County, where it comes to a crossroads with CR 539. From this intersection, Route 72 and CR 532 continue to a junction with CR 610, where CR 532 splits from the route by heading to the east. A short distance later, the route intersects the western terminus of CR 554, which continues along Barnegat Road, and Route 72 turns to the south-southeast through more wooded areas.

The highway enters Stafford Township and passes to the southwest of the residential Ocean Acres community. The route heads to the southwest of Hackensack Meridian Health Southern Ocean Medical Center before it comes to a junction with Nautilus Drive (CR 111). Past this junction, Route 72 widens into a four-lane divided highway, intersecting CR 105 and CR 2 before coming to an interchange with the Garden State Parkway. Following this interchange, the route enters the Manahawkin area and widens to six lanes as it passes woods to the northeast and business areas to the southwest. Route 72 has an interchange with US 9 and continues southeast through a mix of woods and commercial areas as a four-lane road, with CR 50 (Bay Avenue) paralleling the route to the north. The road intersects CR 20 and CR 6 before it passes to the north of the Beach Haven West residential development and passes near wetlands. A road provides access to Bay Avenue before Route 72 crosses the Manahawkin Bay on the Manahawkin Bay Bridge, also known as the Dorland J. Henderson Memorial Bridge. After traversing two small islands consisting of a mix of residences and marshland, the road continues into Ship Bottom on Long Beach Island. Upon entering Ship Bottom, the route splits into a one-way pair following 9th Street eastbound and 8th Street westbound.  Route 72 passes by resort businesses, intersecting CR 4 and CR 89 before ending at CR 607 a block from the Atlantic Ocean.

Route 72 is a major route providing access to Long Beach Island, a popular Jersey Shore resort, from Philadelphia via Route 70 and from New York City via the Garden State Parkway. As such, the portion of the route east of the Garden State Parkway interchange sees congestion during the summer months.

History

What is now Route 72 was originally designated as Route S40 in the 1927 New Jersey state highway renumbering. It was to be a spur of Route 40 that was to run from Route 40 at Four Mile to Route 4 (now US 9) in Manahawkin. By 1941, the route was extended east to the intersection with Long Beach Boulevard in Ship Bottom. In the 1953 New Jersey state highway renumbering, Route S40 was renumbered to Route 72. By 1969, Route 72 was moved to a new alignment to the south between US 9 and the Manahawkin Bay Bridge; the old alignment became Route 180. This route was eventually removed from the state highway system and is now CR 50, although more commonly known as "Bay Avenue".

A freeway was originally proposed for the Route 72 corridor in the late 1960s. The Route 72 freeway was planned to run from the Four Mile Circle to the New Jersey Turnpike in Westampton Township, where it would connect to the proposed I-895 that would continue to I-95 near Bristol, Pennsylvania.   The existing Route 72 would also be widened into a four-lane divided highway. Both I-895 and Route 72 were intended to connect Bucks County, Pennsylvania and the Willingboro area with the Jersey Shore. The proposed freeway for Route 72 was to cost $39 million. However, construction costs and the desire to use money for mass transit led to cancellation of both I-895 and the Route 72 freeway by the 1980s.

In 2000, the Manahawkin Bay Bridge was dedicated the Dorland J. Henderson Memorial Bridge in honor of Dorland J. Henderson, who was one of NJDOT’s top engineers that designed the lighting system for the Manahawkin Bay Bridge. In September 2009, the NJDOT began repairs to the deck of the Manahawkin Bay Bridge. This project, completed in May 2010, cost $4 million and received funding from the American Recovery and Reinvestment Act of 2009. The Manahawkin Bay Bridge underwent a rehabilitation project and a parallel bridge was built to the south. Construction began on the project May 3, 2013. The new bridge was completed in 2016 and carried traffic from both directions while the older bridge was rehabilitated. The rehabilitation of the original bridge was completed in 2019, at which point traffic began using both bridges.

Major intersections

See also

References

External links

NJ State Highways: Route 72
Photos of NJ 72 and former NJ 180
NJ 72 freeway
Speed Limits for State Roads: Route 72

072
Transportation in Burlington County, New Jersey
Transportation in Ocean County, New Jersey
Transportation in the Pine Barrens (New Jersey)